The 2018 Fuzion 100 Manchester Trophy was a professional tennis tournament played on outdoor grass courts. It was the second edition of the tournament and was part of the 2018 ITF Women's Circuit. It took place in Manchester, United Kingdom, on 11–17 June 2018.

Singles main draw entrants

Seeds 

 1 Rankings as of 28 May 2018.

Other entrants 
The following players received a wildcard into the singles main draw:
  Emily Appleton
  Sarah Beth Grey
  Samantha Murray
  Emma Raducanu

The following players received entry from the qualifying draw:
  Kimberly Birrell 
  Mariam Bolkvadze
  Eden Richardson
  Maria Sanchez

Champions

Singles

 Ons Jabeur def.  Sara Sorribes Tormo, 6–2, 6–1

Doubles

 Luksika Kumkhum /  Prarthana Thombare def.  Naomi Broady /  Asia Muhammad, 7–6(7–5), 6–3

External links 
 2018 Fuzion 100 Manchester Trophy at ITFtennis.com
 Official website

2018 ITF Women's Circuit
2018 in British sport
June 2018 sports events in the United Kingdom
Tennis tournaments in England
2018 in English tennis